Thorpe Allen (7 March 1870 – 25 January 1950) was an Australian cricketer who played one First-class match for Queensland in January 1899. 

Allen joined the Colonial Mutual Fire Insurance Company as an office boy in 1886, retiring almost fifty years later in 1935 as a manager.

From the 1920s, Allen was a keen bowls player, serving as a secretary of the East Brisbane club. He collapsed and died on 25 January 1950 while bowling in East Brisbane.

References 

1870 births
1950 deaths
Australian cricketers
Queensland cricketers
Cricketers from Queensland